Astronauts and cosmonauts, and spaceflight participants have observed their religions while in space; sometimes publicly, sometimes privately. Religious adherence in outer space poses unique challenges and opportunities for practitioners. Space travelers have reported profound changes in the way they view their faith related to the overview effect, while some secular groups have criticized the use of government spacecraft for religious activities by astronauts.

Christianity

Apollo 8 Genesis Reading

On Christmas Eve, 1968 astronauts Bill Anders, Jim Lovell, and Frank Borman read from the Book of Genesis as Apollo 8 orbited the Moon. A lawsuit by American Atheists founder Madalyn Murray O'Hair alleged that the observance amounted to a government endorsement of religion in violation of the First Amendment, but the case was dismissed. On August 2nd, 1971, Apollo 15 Mission Commander David Scott left a Bible on the Lunar rover during an Extravehicular activity.

Catholicism
A signed message from Pope Paul VI was included among statements from dozens of other world leaders left on the moon on a silicon disk during the Apollo 11 mission. Following the mission, William Donald Borders, Bishop of the Roman Catholic Diocese of Orlando, told the Pope that the 1917 Code of Canon Law placed the moon within his diocese, as the first explorers had departed from Cape Kennedy which was under his jurisdiction.

The Blessed Sacrament (the body and blood of Christ in the form of consecrated sacramental bread and wine) has been carried into space at least twice. Three Catholic astronauts on Space Shuttle Mission STS-59 received Holy Communion on 17 April 1994. NASA astronaut Michael S. Hopkins took a supply of six consecrated hosts to the International Space Station in September 2013, allowing him to receive the Eucharist weekly during his 24-week mission.

In May 2011, Pope Benedict XVI of the Catholic Church talked to the crew of the Space Shuttle Endeavour while it was in Earth orbit.

Russian Orthodoxy
Russian Orthodox Christmas was celebrated on the International Space Station, on January 7, 2011. Cosmonauts had the day off, but one of the other crew posted on Twitter, "Merry Christmas to all Russia." The whole crew also celebrated on December 25, two weeks prior.

Cosmonauts sometimes at the request of Russian Orthodox church carry religious icons to space which upon return back to Earth are not sold but distributed to churches.

Protestantism
Apollo 11 astronaut Buzz Aldrin, a Presbyterian, performed a communion service for himself using a kit provided by his church. Aldrin had told flight director Chris Kraft of his plans and intended to broadcast the service back to Earth but opted not to at the request of Deke Slayton, due to the continuing controversy over Apollo 8's reading.

A microfilm Bible that had been to the surface of the Moon was auctioned off in 2011. It was a King James Version created after three astronauts lost their lives in the Apollo 1 fire. Ed White, one of the astronauts who perished, had wanted to take a Bible to the Moon.

On STS-128 astronaut Patrick Forrester brought a fragment of a Missionary Aviation Fellowship aircraft which crashed in Ecuador in 1956.

Islam
Muslims in space struggle with fulfilling their religious obligations including kneeling and facing Mecca to pray in microgravity traveling at several kilometres per second. The issue first came up when Sultan bin Salman bin Abdulaziz Al Saud, a Saudi prince, flew aboard STS-51-G and again when Anousheh Ansari flew as a tourist to the International Space Station. In preparation for Malaysian Sheikh Muszaphar Shukor's trip to the ISS in 2007, the National Fatwa Council created "Muslim Obligations in the International Space Station" outlining permissible modifications to rituals such as kneeling when praying (not required in space), facing Mecca when praying (left to the astronaut's best abilities at the start of prayer), and washing (a wet towel will suffice).

In February 2014, the General Authority of Islamic Affairs and Endowment (GAIAE) from Saudi Arabia issued a fatwa forbidding devout Muslims from participating as crew members in Mars One's proposed one-way mission to Mars. Speaking for the clerical group, Farooq Hamada explained that, "Protecting life against all possible dangers and keeping it safe is an issue agreed upon by all religions and is clearly stipulated in verse 4/29 of the Holy Quran: Do not kill yourselves or one another. Indeed, Allah is to you ever Merciful."

Judaism
Time and date-related observances are important in Judaism, and there have been considerations on the observance of time by Jewish astronauts.

American astronaut Jeffrey Hoffman took multiple Jewish objects to space on his space flights from 1985 to 1996: a miniature Torah scroll, a yad, a Torah breastplate, mezuzot (plural of "mezuzah"), menorahs, a dreidel, hand-woven tallit, and kiddush cups.

In January 2003, a microfilm Torah, a handwritten copy of the Shabbat kiddush, and a miniature Torah scroll rescued from the Bergen-Belsen concentration camp were taken to space by Israeli astronaut Ilan Ramon aboard the Space Shuttle Columbia. Ramon and the rest of the crew died when the shuttle disintegrated during reentry. In September 2006, Canadian astronaut Steve MacLean took another Torah from Bergen-Belsen aboard the Space Shuttle Atlantis to the International Space Station as a tribute to Ramon.

Hinduism
In December 2006, American astronaut Sunita Williams took a copy of the Bhagavad Gita to the International Space Station. In July 2012, she took there a peaceful Om and a copy of the Upanishads.

On 27 February 2021, SDSAT a 3U cubesat launched aboard PSLV-C51 carried a digital copy of Bhagavad Gita into space in an SD card

See also
List of religious ideas in science fiction
Astronomy and religion
Religion in Antarctica

References

External links
 Performing Ibadah at the International Space Station'
 Christmas in the Heavens (NASA, 2003) 
 Christmas in Space (DLR, 2011)

Space
Spaceflight